The Craig Newmark Graduate School of Journalism at the City University of New York is a public graduate journalism school located in New York City. One of the 25 institutions comprising the City University of New York, or CUNY, the school opened in 2006. It is the only public graduate school of journalism in the northeastern United States.

The Newmark Graduate School of Journalism grants two Master of Arts degrees, the Master of Arts in Journalism, including a version with a unique bilingual subject concentration in English and Spanish, and the nation's first Master of Arts in Engagement Journalism. The school, which requires its MA students to complete a summer internship at a news organization in order to graduate, places a heavy emphasis on practical skills and hands-on experience. Its faculty is drawn from current and former journalists at The New York Times, BusinessWeek, The Economist, The Nation, NBC Nightly News, and PBS, among others.

Graciela Mochkofsky is the third Dean of the Newmark Graduate School of Journalism. She succeeded Sarah Bartlett, who served as Dean from January 2014 to June 2022, and founding Dean Stephen B. Shepard, who headed the school from 2005 to 2014. 

In June 2018, the school announced it would change its name from the City University of New York's CUNY Graduate School of Journalism to the Craig Newmark Graduate School of Journalism at the City University of New York, after the Craigslist founder donated $20 million to the school's foundation.

History
The CUNY Board of Trustees approved the Graduate School of Journalism's creation in May 2004. Proposed by CUNY Chancellor Matthew Goldstein, the school was to focus on teaching reporting skills and news values at a time when other journalism schools were emphasizing education in academic disciplines such as political science and statistics.

After a search that weighed dozens of journalists and educators, former BusinessWeek editor-in-chief Stephen B. Shepard was chosen as the school's first dean.  Goldstein and Shephard had worked together before; as head of CUNY's research foundation, Goldstein helped BusinessWeek formulate its business school rankings in the 1980s.  Former New York Daily News editor Pete Hamill was also among those considered. 

The school admitted its first class, comprising 57 students, in the fall of 2006. Dean Baquet, now executive editor of The New York Times, spoke at the school's first graduation ceremony in December 2007 and received an honorary degree. Veteran broadcast journalist and presidential aide Bill Moyers addressed students at the school's second graduation commencement ceremony a year later.

Governance
The school has a strong culture of community governance. A Governance Council composed of full-time faculty, adjuncts, staff, students, and alumni meets once a semester to consider and vote on curriculum, policy, and standards. In addition to an Executive Committee that considers matters requiring a decision between regular Governance Council meetings, there are six standing committees: Campus Life and Facilities, Curriculum and Degree Requirements, Diversity, Outcomes Assessment, Strategic Planning, and Technology and Library. The by-laws and other relevant materials are on the Governance Council page in the About section of the website, www.journalism.cuny.edu.

Campus

The Newmark Graduate School of Journalism is located in Midtown Manhattan, near Times Square. It is housed in the former headquarters of The New York Herald Tribune, on West 40th Street which CUNY purchased in August 2004 for $60 million. Renovation of the building cost $10.7 million and took place at the same time that The New York Times was building a new, 52-story office tower to house its headquarters next door.

The campus building houses a newsroom with seats for 130, a broadcast studio, several multimedia editing suites, a fully digital library and research center with 1,500 books on journalism, as well as numerous classrooms.

In 2006, the school hosted a reunion of about 100 former New York Herald Tribune journalists gathered to commemorate the 40th anniversary of the paper's closing in 1966. The school also regularly runs panel discussions and other events relevant to the field of journalism and journalism education as well as issues in the news.

Curriculum
The school's three-semester MA in Journalism program formerly included media tracks in print, interactive and broadcast, though in March 2009 the requirement to choose a track was removed. It also offers subject concentrations in arts/culture, bilingual, business/economics, health/science, international, and urban reporting. Students participate in a summer internship for which they receive at least $4,000 in compensation during the summer between their second and third semesters. The school offers a flexible schedule option that allows students to extend their study over four semesters or more.

Student life

Multimedia projects and spot news stories appear on the school's award-winning NYCity News Service, which runs stories written by students.

The school also produces a student-run TV news magazine show — 219West, which runs on CUNY TV and is named after the building's Manhattan address on West 40th Street — as well as a podcast called AudioFiles.

In addition, students contribute stories to the Bronx-based neighborhood news outlets Mott Haven Herald and Hunts Point Express.

The school offers a number of on-campus student organizations and clubs, including the Asian American Journalists Club, Association of Black Journalists, Audiovisual Club, National Association of Hispanic Journalists, Photojournalism Club, Queer Club, and Women in Media.

Dean Mochkofsky 
A native of Argentina, Graciela Mochkofsky joined the Newmark J-School in 2016 to launch the nation’s first bilingual master’s journalism concentration in English and Spanish. Three years later, she added the Center for Community Media (CCM) to her portfolio, serving as executive director to an enterprise that supports hundreds of news outlets covering immigrants and communities of color across the country.

Under Mochkofsky’s leadership, the Newmark J-School trained six cohorts of bilingual journalists who are working in newsrooms across the country. She also hosted five Latino Media Summits, both in person and remotely; conceived and developed separate Latino, Black, and Asian media initiatives; and led a groundbreaking project that helped New York community media receive $25 million in city advertising in the first two years of the COVID-19 pandemic.

All the while, she continued her journalistic work, as a writer for The Paris Review, The Atlantic, and The New Yorker. She is the author of six nonfiction books in Spanish, two of them about the relationship between press and political power in her home country. Her latest book, The Prophet of the Andes, about a Peruvian Catholic community that converted to Orthodox Judaism and immigrated to the Jewish settlements in the West Bank, was published in English by Knopf in August 2022.

She earned her bachelor’s in journalism and communications at Universidad del Salvador in Buenos Aires and has an M.S. in Journalism from the Columbia University’s Graduate School of Journalism.

Notable alumni

 Adeola Fayehun
 Nico Grant - Technology reporter at the New York Times.
 Daisy Rosario - 
 Tanzina Vega - Formerly host of The Takeaway on WNYC, formerly The New York Times 
Lena Masri - Investigative reporter for Reuters in London
Kenyon Farrow - Journalist and Activist. Senior Editor of The Body and The Body Pro.

Notes and references

External links
 

 
Journalism schools in the United States
Universities and colleges in Manhattan
Educational institutions established in 2004
Journalism
Midtown Manhattan
2004 establishments in New York City